The Second Lee Kuan Yew Cabinet was the Cabinet of Singapore from 19 October 1963 to 15 April 1968.

The cabinet was formed by Prime Minister Lee Kuan Yew after the People's Action Party won a supermajority of the seats in the Parliament of Singapore in the 1963 general election. It is the cabinet that governed Singapore when it was a state in Malaysia. It is also Singapore's first cabinet following its independence on 9 August 1965.

The cabinet was succeeded by the Third Lee Kuan Yew Cabinet.

Ministers

Ministers of State and Parliamentary Secretaries

References 

Executive branch of the government of Singapore
Lists of political office-holders in Singapore
Cabinets established in 1963
Lee Kuan Yew